HMS Pendennis was a 50-gun fourth rate ship of the line of the English Royal Navy, built by Robert and John Castle at Deptford, and launched in 1695.

The Pendennis was captured by the French 50-gun ship Protée, supported by Triton and Salisbury, off the Dogger Bank on 20 October 1705.

See also
List of ships captured in the 18th century

References

Bibliography

Lavery, Brian (2003) The Ship of the Line - Volume 1: The development of the battlefleet 1650-1850. Conway Maritime Press. .
Winfield, Rif (2009) British Warships in the Age of Sail 1603-1714: Design, Construction, Careers and Fates. Seaforth Publishing. .

Ships of the line of the Royal Navy
1690s ships